The 2017 North Carolina Tar Heels football team represented the University of North Carolina at Chapel Hill as a member of Coastal Division of the Atlantic Coast Conference (ACC) during the 2017 NCAA Division I FBS football season. The team was led by sixth-year head coach Larry Fedora and played their home games at Kenan Memorial Stadium. The Tar Heels finished the season 3–9 overall and 1–7 in ACC play to place last out of seven teams in the Coastal Division.

Schedule

Game summaries

California

Louisville

at Old Dominion

Duke

at Georgia Tech

Notre Dame

Virginia

at Virginia Tech

Miami (FL)

at Pittsburgh

Western Carolina

at NC State

2018 NFL Draft

References

North Carolina
North Carolina Tar Heels football seasons
North Carolina Tar Heels football